Lieutenant-Colonel Frederick Rossmore Wauchope Eveleigh-de-Moleyns, 5th Baron Ventry,  (11 December 1861 – 23 September 1923), was a British Army officer and Anglo-Irish peer.

Ventry was the son of The 4th Baron Ventry and Harriet Wauchope. He was given the additional surname of Eveleigh when his father changed the family name in 1874. He was educated at Harrow School and the Royal Military College, Sandhurst. 

He was commissioned into the 4th Queen's Own Hussars. He fought in the Second Matabele War between 1896 and 1897, being Mentioned in Dispatches twice. In 1897 he was decorated as a Companion of the Distinguished Service Order. He was promoted to major in 1898 and retired as a lieutenant-colonel. He succeeded to his father's title on 8 February 1914. Lord Ventry served as Deputy Lieutenant of County Kerry. He died unmarried and was succeeded by his nephew.

References

External links
 

1861 births
1923 deaths
Barons in the Peerage of Ireland
19th-century Anglo-Irish people
20th-century Anglo-Irish people
4th Queen's Own Hussars officers
People educated at Harrow School
Graduates of the Royal Military College, Sandhurst
Deputy Lieutenants of Kerry
Companions of the Distinguished Service Order